Hurel is a surname. Notable people with the surname include:

Sandrine Hurel (born 1968), French politician
Tony Hurel (born 1987), French cyclist
Camille Hurel (born 1998), French model
Charles Hurel, French Baroque composer, lutenist, and theorbist

See also
Hubel
Türel